Leszek Nowosielski (born 26 February 1992, in Opole) is a Polish footballer. Besides Poland, he has played in Scotland.

Career

Club
In July 2011, he joined GKS Bełchatów on a three-year contract.

On 14 November 2014, Nowosielski agreed to a short-term contract with Scottish League Two club Montrose until January 2015, however due to delays in receiving international clearance he didn't make his debut for the club until 6 December 2014.

On 31 January 2015, Nowosielski made his debut for Turriff United coming on as a substitute for the final 15 minutes of a 3-0 win over Huntly in the Press & Journal Highland League. He made his first start for the club on 7 February, this time in the Breedon Aggregates League Cup, Turriff won the match 4-1 to progress to the Quarter Finals.

International
He was a part of Poland national under-20 football team.

References

External links
 
 

1992 births
Living people
Sportspeople from Opole
Polish footballers
Association football midfielders
Ekstraklasa players
GKS Bełchatów players
Warta Poznań players
Montrose F.C. players
Scottish Professional Football League players
Highland Football League players
Turriff United F.C. players
Deveronvale F.C. players
Polish expatriate footballers
Expatriate footballers in Scotland
Polish expatriates in Scotland
MKS Kluczbork players
Poland youth international footballers